Marie Martha Kibler (later Philips, June 29, 1912 – July 1, 1978) was an American artistic gymnast. She competed at the 1936 Summer Olympics and placed fifth with the American team. She later married Chet Phillips, a fellow gymnast who also competed at the 1936 Games.

References

1912 births
1978 deaths
American female artistic gymnasts
Gymnasts at the 1936 Summer Olympics
Olympic gymnasts of the United States
Sportspeople from Atlantic City, New Jersey
20th-century American women